Gelsemium elegans, commonly known as heartbreak grass, is a poisonous plant of the family Gelsemiaceae found in China and other Asian countries. It contains toxic alkaloids such as gelsemine, gelsenicine, gelsevirine and koumine.

Crumbled leaves of this plant, surreptitiously added to food, were used in the 23rd of December 2011 poisoning of Long Liyuan, a magnate of the Chinese timber industry, and perhaps in the 10th of November 2012 poisoning of Alexander Perepilichny, a Russian financier cooperating with a fraud investigation in London, though the role of the plant in his death has been disputed.

References

Gelsemiaceae
Poisonous plants